Huang Quan may refer to:
Huang Quan (general) (died 240), general during the Han dynasty and Three Kingdoms periods
Huang Quan (painter) (903–968), painter during the Five Dynasties and Song dynasty periods

See also
Diyu, Chinese hell (realm of the dead), also known as "Huangquan"
Yomi, Japanese hell (realm of the dead)